Eric Freeman (1970 – August 3, 2021) was an American artist based in New York City.

Freeman was born in Brooklyn.  He painted on linen with oils, creating abstract landscapes which reference Color Field painting and optical illusions.  His work has drawn comparison to Mark Rothko, Ellsworth Kelly, James Turrell, Frank Stella, Dan Flavin and Josef Albers. Freeman died August 3, 2021.

Selected exhibitions
1999
Gallery 56, Budapest, Hungary
Size Matters, Gale Gates, Brooklyn
2000
Stefan Stux Gallery, Project Room, New York
2003
Bjorn Wetterling Gallery, Stockholm
2004
New Paintings, Western Project, Culver City
2005
Alain Noirhumme, Brussels, Belgium
Mary Boone Gallery, New York

References

External links
Eric Freeman on ArtFacts.net
Eric Freeman on ArtNet.com
Further information from the Saatchi Gallery

1970 births
2021 deaths
People from Brooklyn
American landscape painters